Phillip Lee Hayes (born 17 May 1986) is a former English cricketer and current co-founder and CEO of Kloodle. Hayes is a left-handed batsman who bowls leg break.  He was born in Bolton, Greater Manchester and educated at Bury College.

While studying for his degree at Loughborough University, Hayes made his first-class debut for Loughborough UCCE against Leicestershire in 2009. He made a further appearance for the team in 2009, against Kent.  In his two first-class matches, he batted once, scoring 38 runs in the match against Leicestershire.

Phillip is co-founder of Kloodle, a social network for graduate recruitment.

References

External links
Phil Hayes at ESPNcricinfo
Phil Hayes at CricketArchive

1986 births
Living people
Cricketers from Bolton
Alumni of Loughborough University
English cricketers
Loughborough MCCU cricketers